Bernard Markey (7 November 1935 – 23 July 2003) was an Irish Fine Gael politician who served both as a Teachta Dála (TD) and as a Senator. Markey was first elected to Seanad Éireann on the Labour Panel in 1973 and was re-elected to the Seanad in 1977. He was elected to Dáil Éireann at the 1981 general election for the Louth constituency, and held the seat at the February 1982 general election. He lost his seat at the November 1982 general election and was also an unsuccessful candidate at the 1989 general election.

References

1935 births
2003 deaths
Fine Gael TDs
Local councillors in County Louth
Members of the 13th Seanad
Members of the 14th Seanad
Members of the 22nd Dáil
Members of the 23rd Dáil
Fine Gael senators